The  was held on 28 January 2018 at Yokohama, Kanagawa, Japan. The awards ceremony was held in the city's Kanagawa Prefectural Music Hall, the results having been announced on 2 December 2018.

Awards
 Best Film: - The Tokyo Night Sky Is Always the Densest Shade of Blue 
 Best Director: Kazuya Shiraishi - Birds Without Names and 
 Yoshimitsu Morita Memorial Best New Director: 
  - 
 Yukihiro Morigaki - Goodbye, Grandpa!
 Best Screenplay: Yuya Ishii - The Tokyo Night Sky Is Always the Densest Shade of Blue
 Best Cinematographer: Yoichi Kamagari - The Tokyo Night Sky Is Always the Densest Shade of Blue
 Best Actor: Sosuke Ikematsu - The Tokyo Night Sky Is Always the Densest Shade of Blue
 Best Actress: Yū Aoi - Birds Without Names
 Best Supporting Actor: 
 Sansei Shiomi - Outrage Coda
 Tori Matsuzaka - Birds Without Names
 Best Supporting Actress: 
  - 
 Wakana Matsumoto - 
 Best Newcomer:
 Shizuka Ishibashi - The Tokyo Night Sky Is Always the Densest Shade of Blue
 Yukino Kishii - Goodbye, Grandpa!
 Judges' Special Award:  reboot project
 Special Grand Prize: Toshiyuki Nishida - Outrage Coda

Top 10
 The Tokyo Night Sky Is Always the Densest Shade of Blue
 Dear Etranger
 Birds Without Names
 Wilderness
 
 Close-Knit
 
 The Third Murder
 
 Outrage Coda
runner-up. Before We Vanish

References

Yokohama Film Festival
Yokohama Film Festival
2018 in Japanese cinema
2017 film awards